Crescent Mall is a shopping mall in Ho Chi Minh City, Vietnam, located at Phú Mỹ Hưng planned city in District 7. The mall has an area of  that consists of 200 stores, a supermarket, cinema, restaurants, cafes, and gaming stadium. The mall was designed by Tan Gek Meng, and developed and owned by Phu My Hung Corporation. The mall design incorporates the concept of ruyi, which is said to bring good luck and fortune. The mall's current anchor tenant is Co.opmart, while previous anchors of the mall include Giant and Auchan.

History
The initial concept of Crescent Mall was first unveiled on 9 April 2008 by Phu My Hung Corporation. Skidmore, Owings and Merrill, and Design International were chosen as the master planners for Crescent Mall, with KORN Architekten, a German-based architecture firm as designers for the mall. Architect Axel Korn designed the building. The manager and leasing agent was Savills. The elevators and escalators were provided by Schindler and installed by Jardine Matheson.

The groundbreaking ceremony was performed on 12 June 2009 and construction began in July that year. During the groundbreaking ceremony, Vietcombank formed a consortium with Vietinbank, Bao Viet Bank, Gia Dinh Bank, and Asia Commercial Bank to grant Phu My Hung Corporation a loan worth 1.2 trillion ₫ within 10 years. The mall had an invite-only preview by Phu Mu Hung Corporation to selected guests, largely international and luxury brands, on 28 January 2010, before making retail lots available for lease.

The mall was officially opened to the public on 30 November 2011. The first Giant store in Vietnam opened in Crescent Mall, serving as the mall's first anchor tenant until 28 November 2018, when the Vietnamese operation was acquired by French-based retailer Auchan and replaced as anchor. However, Auchan announced its withdrawal from the Vietnamese market in May 2019 due to unprofitable and unsustainable operations in Vietnam and competition with the local supermarket chain Co.opmart. Auchan has closed most of its Vietnamese stores, but its branch in Crescent Mall will remain in operation until Tết in 2020 where after this period the anchor itself will be rebranded as Co.opmart.

H&M opened its third Vietnamese store in Crescent Mall on 8 September 2018.

Due to the increasing demand for business and retailers, Phu My Hung Corporation invested additional funds in February 2019 to upgrade and expand Crescent Mall as part of the Phú Mỹ Hưng infrastructure upgrade plan. This expansion of the mall will include phase 2 of Crescent Mall and an additional 24-story office building known as Crescent Hub. The mall expanded an additional  at the end of 2019. In July 2020, the Kpop coffee brand SMTown Café opened its first location in Vietnam in the mall.

Design
The design of this mall was said to be inspired by the concept of ruyi which is a symbol of good luck and fortune.

Retail
Crescent Mall contains  of retail space. It has a large variety of stores including international chains such as GAP and Tommy Hilfiger, restaurants, a cinema, and a supermarket: Co.opmart. There are numerous chain stores selling clothes and cosmetics, as well as gift and souvenir stores. Among the cafes are branches of Gloria Jean's Coffees and The Coffee Bean & Tea Leaf.

See also
 Diamond Plaza

References

External links

 Official website The Crescent

Shopping malls in Ho Chi Minh City
Buildings and structures in Ho Chi Minh City
Buildings and structures completed in 2011
Shopping malls established in 2011
2011 establishments in Vietnam